David Kramár (born 23 May 1979) is a Czech former speed skater. He competed in the men's 1000 metres event at the 2002 Winter Olympics.

References

External links
 

1979 births
Living people
Czech male speed skaters
Olympic speed skaters of the Czech Republic
Speed skaters at the 2002 Winter Olympics
People from Nové Město na Moravě
Sportspeople from the Vysočina Region